White Men Can't Jump is a 1992 American sports comedy film written and directed by Ron Shelton. It stars Wesley Snipes and Woody Harrelson as streetball hustlers. The film was released in the United States on March 27, 1992, by 20th Century Fox.

Plot
Billy Hoyle is a former college basketball player who makes a 
living by hustling streetballers across Los Angeles who assume he cannot play well because he is white. Sidney Deane is a talented but cocky player who is twice beaten by Billy, once in a half-court team game and later in a one-on-one shootout for money.

Billy and his live-in girlfriend, Gloria Clemente, are on the run from the Stucci brothers, mobsters to whom he owes a gambling debt. A voracious reader, Gloria makes note of obscure facts. Gloria's goal in life is to be a contestant on the television game show Jeopardy! and make a fortune. Sidney wants to rent a house for his family outside the rough Baldwin Village neighborhood. He proposes a business partnership with Billy where they will hustle other players by deliberately setting them up to pick Billy as Sidney's teammate. At first, their system is very successful, but when they unexpectedly lose a game, it turns out that Sidney had double-crossed Billy by deliberately playing badly to avenge his earlier loss to him, causing Billy to lose $1,700 to a group of Sidney's friends.

Gloria, who wants Billy to find a stable job, is incensed at Billy for blowing his money again, but realizes he was hustled after Billy tells her how it happened. They go to Sidney's apartment and appeal to his wife Rhonda. The women agree to share the money, provided Sidney and Billy team up for a major two-on-two outdoor tournament. Despite their constant bickering, Sidney and Billy win the tournament and the grand prize of $5,000, largely due to Billy's ability to disrupt his opponents' concentration. Billy's most notable claim is that he is "in the zone", a state of mind in which nothing can distract him. Sidney is pleased with the outcome, but he cannot help mocking Billy about his inability to slam dunk.

Billy insists that he can indeed dunk, and after Sidney disagrees, Billy offers to bet his share of the $5,000 on his ability to dunk. Sidney gives him three chances, telling him "white men can't jump". Billy fails and squanders his share. When he tells Gloria, she leaves him. Desperate to get her back, Billy goes to Sidney for help. Sidney reveals that he has a friend who works as a security guard at the TV studio that produces Jeopardy! His friend, Robert, agrees to use his connections to get her on the show if Billy can sink a hook shot from beyond the half-court line, which he does. Gloria initially stumbles over sports questions (such as naming Babe Ruth as the all-time NBA rebound leader), but makes a comeback with a pet topic, "Foods That Begin With the Letter Q". She wins $14,100 on her first episode.

Billy sings Gloria a song he has composed and wins her back. As Billy and Gloria discuss their new future, Sidney is desperate for Billy's help. His apartment was burglarized and his winnings were stolen. He and Rhonda are desperate for money so they can move to a better neighborhood. Gloria is expecting Billy to get a steady job and settle down, but Sidney informs him that two hoops legends of the L.A. streetball scene, "The King" and "The Duck", are playing at the courts downtown. Sidney asks Billy to partner with him to play against them. Billy enthusiastically agrees, offering to gamble his share of Gloria's take. Gloria warns that if Billy gambles with her money, they are through, regardless of the outcome. Billy sides with Sidney, feeling he must honor the obligation he owes Sidney for getting Gloria on Jeopardy!. They play a final game against King and Duck. In a very tight game, Sidney and Billy prevail, the winning point coming when Sidney lobs an "alley-oop" pass to Billy, who dunks it.

Billy returns home, happy for having doubled his share of Gloria's winnings, but he is crushed to find that Gloria has kept her word and left him for good. The mobsters who are after Billy find him and he pays off his debts. Billy asks Sidney to set him up with a real job, and Sidney remarks that Billy and Gloria may be better off without each other. The film ends as Billy and Sidney launch into yet another basketball argument and return to the court where they first met to play a one-on-one game, this time as friends.

Cast

 Wesley Snipes as Sidney Deane 
 Woody Harrelson as Billy Hoyle
 Rosie Perez as Gloria Clemente
 Tyra Ferrell as Rhonda Deane
 Cylk Cozart as Robert
 Kadeem Hardison as Junior
 Ernest Harden, Jr. as George
 Nigel Miguel as Dwight "The Flight" McGhee
 Duane Martin as Willie Lewis
 Freeman Williams as Duck Johnson
 Louis Price as Eddie "The King" Faroo
 Marques Johnson as Raymond
 Alex Trebek as Himself
 Allan Malamud as Rocket Scientist

Production 

Bob Lanier, Detroit Pistons and Milwaukee Bucks player and Hall of Famer, was hired as basketball coach for the film. Lanier was impressed with Harrelson and Snipes, suggesting both reached a Division II college basketball skill level. He also noted that between the two of them, Harrelson was the better player.

The original music soundtrack and song "If I Lose" were composed by saxophonist and composer Bennie Wallace, who also scored Shelton's film Blaze.

The musical R&B quintet Riff recorded a song and accompanying music video called "White Men Can't Jump" for the movie. The music video featured Harrelson, Snipes and Perez. It can be seen on the DVD release with bonus features.

Marques Johnson has a supporting role as Raymond, who loses a game to Snipes and Harrelson. Johnson was a star player for UCLA's 1974–75 national championship team coached by John Wooden and later played for the NBA's Bucks, Clippers, and Warriors.

Freeman Williams, who played "Duck" Johnson, also had a distinguished NBA career, playing for the Clippers, Jazz, and Bullets from 1978–86.

NBA player Gary Payton made an uncredited appearance as an unidentified street baller.

The category "Foods that start with the letter 'Q was an actual category on an October 1997 episode of Jeopardy!

There is a video game based on the film for the Atari Jaguar console.

To introduce a new basketball shoe, Nike teamed up with the makers of White Men Can't Jump to assemble the package of shoes inspired by the characters Billy Hoyle and Sidney Deane.

Music
Two soundtracks were released by Capitol Records. The first soundtrack using the film title was released on March 24, 1992, and consisted mostly of R&B. The soundtrack peaked at number 92 on the Billboard 200 and number 48 on the Top R&B/Hip-Hop Albums chart and features the single "White Men Can't Jump" by Riff, which peaked at number 90 on the Billboard Hot 100. AllMusic rated it two and a half out of five stars.

The second White Men Can't Rap was released on April 7, 1992, and consisted entirely of hip hop. It reached number 79 on the Billboard Top R&B/Hip-Hop Albums chart. AllMusic rated it two out of five stars. The only single coming out of the EP soundtrack was "Fakin' the Funk" by Main Source.

White Men Can't Jump soundtrack"White Men Can't Jump"- 3:35 (Riff)  
"Sympin" (Radio Remix)- 5:02 (Boyz II Men) 
"The Hook"- 3:43 (Queen Latifah) 
"Let Me Make It Up to You Tonight"- 4:30 (Jody Watley) 
"Don't Ever Let 'Em See You Sweat"- 4:19 (Go West)  
"I'm Going Up"- 3:40 (BeBe & CeCe)
"Can You Come Out and Play"- 3:45 (The O'Jays)  
"Watch Me Do My Thang"- 3:58 (Lipstick)  
"If I Lose"- 4:04 (Aretha Franklin) 
"Jump for It"- 4:08 (Jesse Johnson)
"Just a Closer Walk With Thee"- 3:07 (Venice Beach Boys)
"Jamais vu"- 4:30 (Bonus Track 2007) - (Kool Matope)White Men Can't Rap
"A to the K" – 3:20 (Cypress Hill)
"Area Code 213" – 4:28 (Boo-Yaa T.R.I.B.E.)
"Fakin' the Funk" – 3:30 (Main Source)
"Freezin' Em" – 5:14 (Level III)
"How to Act" – 3:14 (College Boyz)
"Now You're Mine" – 2:55 (Gang Starr)

Reception

Box office
White Men Can't Jump grossed $14,711,124 in 1,923 theaters in its opening weekend, with a total gross of $76,253,806 in the U.S. and $90,753,806 worldwide and was the 16th highest-grossing movie of 1992.

Critical response
The film received positive reviews. On review aggregator Rotten Tomatoes, the film holds an approval rating of 77% based on 57 reviews, with an average score of 6.40/10. The website's critical consensus reads, "White Men Can't Jump provides a fresh take on the sports comedy genre, with a clever script and a charismatic trio of leads." On Metacritic, the film received a score of 65 based on 28 reviews, indicating "generally favorable reviews".

Roger Ebert of the Chicago Sun-Times gave the film three and a half stars, saying it was "not simply a basketball movie", praising Ron Shelton for "knowing his characters". Janet Maslin from The New York Times praised Wesley Snipes for his "funny, knowing performance with a lot of physical verve". The film was a favorite of director Stanley Kubrick.

Year-end lists
The film is recognized by American Film Institute in these lists:
 2008: AFI's 10 Top 10:
 Nominated Sports Film

Remake

In January 2017, Kenya Barris was developing a White Men Can't Jump remake with NBA star Blake Griffin and NFL player Ryan Kalil producing. In March 2022, rapper Jack Harlow was cast in the film.

References

External links

 
 

1992 films
1990s sports comedy films
American basketball films
American sports comedy films
1990s English-language films
American buddy comedy films
20th Century Fox films
Films directed by Ron Shelton
Films set in Los Angeles
Films shot in Los Angeles
African-American films
1990s buddy comedy films
1992 comedy films
1990s American films